The 1987 Football League Cup Final was a football match played on 5 April 1987 between Arsenal and Liverpool. The match, played in front of 96,000 spectators at Wembley Stadium, was won by Arsenal 2–1. Ian Rush opened the scoring for Liverpool with a side foot finish to the corner of the net, before Charlie Nicholas equalised, turning in a cross from the right in a crowded penalty area. Nicholas was credited with scoring the winning goal in the second half from a Perry Groves cross. His off-target shot deflected off Ronnie Whelan and was diverted past Liverpool goalkeeper Bruce Grobbelaar's outstretched hand and into the left corner of the net.

Arsenal also finished fourth in the First Division, but were unable to compete in the 1987–88 UEFA Cup as UEFA voted for the ban in English clubs in European competitions to continue for a third season.

Ian Rush's goal was his first to be scored on the losing side in any competition. It ended Liverpool's 144-match unbeaten streak in matches he had scored in.

Match details

References

External links
LFC History Match Report 

1987
League Cup Final 1987
League Cup Final 1987
1986–87 Football League
Football League Cup Final
Football League Cup Final